Casillo–Petroli Firenze–Hopplà (UCI code: CPH) is an Italian UCI Continental cycling team founded in 2019. The team was amateur in 2019, and gained UCI status in 2020.

Team roster

References

UCI Continental Teams (Europe)
Cycling teams based in Italy
Cycling teams established in 2019